Dieter Monien (born 26 May 1950) is a German sports shooter. He competed in the mixed skeet event at the 1976 Summer Olympics.

References

1950 births
Living people
German male sport shooters
Olympic shooters of East Germany
Shooters at the 1976 Summer Olympics
Sportspeople from Brandenburg